Nazanin Rafsanjani is the former head of new show development for Gimlet Media. Previously she was creative director at Gimlet Media and before that, a senior producer for The Rachel Maddow Show.

Rafsanjani was featured in the first season of Gimlet's podcast StartUp, consulting with her husband Alex Blumberg as he launched a media company then called American Podcasting Corporation. As the business grew, Rafsanjani elected to join the team, specifically to develop branded podcasts (podcasts produced by Gimlet on behalf of advertisers) as a source of revenue for the firm. The first branded podcast from Rafsanjani's four-person creative team at Gimlet was a six-episode series for eBay called Open for Business, which hit number one on the iTunes podcast chart. Rafsanjani has been praised for the journalism and producing skills she brings to Gimlet's marketing projects; hiring for her team at Gimlet Creative also drew from journalism, including Katelyn Bogucki from The Huffington Post and Frances Harlow from NPR's Planet Money.

In 2013, Rafsanjani was nominated for an Emmy, with The Rachel Maddow Show team, for Outstanding News Discussion and Analysis. She has also been a contributor to This American Life and a 2006 NPR-Bucksbaum International Fellow.

She serves on the board of directors of Human Rights First.

References

External links
 Twice Removed podcast Episode 3: "Nazanin Rafsanjani" (January 13, 2017)

American male journalists
American podcasters
American television producers
American women television producers
Living people
Year of birth missing (living people)
American women podcasters
21st-century American women